Beatriz Guido (13 December 1924 – 4 March 1988) was an Argentine novelist and screenwriter.

Biography 
Guido was born in Rosario, Santa Fe Province, the daughter of architect Ángel Guido (renowned as the creator of the National Flag Memorial) and of Uruguayan actress Berta Eirin. She studied at the Faculty of Philosophy and Letters of the University of Buenos Aires.

She wrote her first novel, La casa del ángel, in 1954. She also wrote a short story named Usurpacion. Because of her outspoken anti-Peronism, she was branded a "right-wing writer" and a "false aristocrat" by the government of Juan Perón. In 1959 she married film director and screenwriter Leopoldo Torre Nilsson. She started working with her husband, who took several of her works to the screen.

In 1984 she won the Konex Merit Diploma on Letters.at the age of 63.

Selected filmography
 The Kidnapper  (1958)
 Traitors of San Angel (1967)

References 
 
 
 Beatriz Guido at the Fundación Konex website
 Guido, 1966 interview reproduction by Horacio Verbitsky, Página/12, 9 February 2006

1924 births
1988 deaths
Argentine people of Uruguayan descent
Argentine women novelists
People from Rosario, Santa Fe
20th-century Argentine novelists
Women screenwriters
20th-century Argentine women writers
20th-century Argentine writers
20th-century Argentine screenwriters